The Barrier (transliterated: Al Hajiz) is a 1990 Bahraini drama film directed and produced by Bassam Al-Thawadi, starring Ebrahim Bahar, Rashed Al-Hassan, and Mariam Ziman. The screenplay was written by Ameen Salih. The film is widely regarded as being the first feature film produced in Bahrain.

Summary
The movie deals with social and emotional barriers imposed upon individuals by society and also with those that the individual imposes upon himself. The characters in the movie lack the ability to communicate with each other and therefore, fail to understand their own emotions. Hence, they fail to maintain healthy relationships with each other because of the lack of love amongst them. This failure is attributed to the surrounding environment that does not allow for healthy relationships to grow and prosper.

Cast
Ebrahim Bahar as Mustafa
Rashed Al-Hassan as Hassan
Mariam Ziman as Fatima
Gahtan Al-Gahtani as Mohammed
Latifa Mujren as the Mother
Abdulrahman Barakat as the Father
Soad Ali as Huda	
Anwar Ahmed as Gang man
Norah Yousif as the Neighbor
Amina Hussain as Street Girl

References

Bahraini drama films
Films shot in Bahrain